Raymond Charles Timgren (September 29, 1928 – November 25, 1999) was a Canadian professional ice hockey forward, nicknamed the "Golden Boy". He played in the National Hockey League with the Toronto Maple Leafs and Chicago Black Hawks between 1948 and 1955.

Playing career
Timgren was born in Windsor, Ontario and started his National Hockey League career with the Toronto Maple Leafs in 1949. He also played for the Chicago Black Hawks. He left the NHL after the 1954–55 season. He played for the Pittsburgh Hornets of the American Hockey League in 1956 before retiring from hockey. He won the Stanley Cup twice with the Toronto Maple Leafs, in 1949 and 1951.

Personal life
In the 1960s he was teaching with the North York Board of Education, and in 1964 was a vice principal at Sloane Ave Public School. "Do it now!" was one of his favorite sayings and he never put off what he could now! Ray was also Principal at Mallow Road Public School in Don Mills in the late-1960s - 1970s and then at Glen Rush Public School.

Timgren's parents emigrated to Canada from Terjärv, in Finland.

Career statistics

Regular season and playoffs

External links 
 

1928 births
1999 deaths
Canadian ice hockey forwards
Canadian people of Finnish descent
Chicago Blackhawks players
Ice hockey people from Ontario
Ontario Hockey Association Senior A League (1890–1979) players
Pittsburgh Hornets players
Sportspeople from Windsor, Ontario
Stanley Cup champions
Toronto Maple Leafs players
Toronto Marlboros players